This is a list of people from Devon, a county in South West England. The demonym of Devon is Devonian. This list is arranged alphabetically by surname.

A more complete listing is at :Category:People from Devon.

A
 Henry Avery (1659 – after 1696), pirate

B
 Charles Babbage (1791–1871), inventor
Baldwin of Exeter (d. 1190), Archbishop of Canterbury
 W. N. P. Barbellion: pen name of Bruce Frederick Cummings, diarist
Sir Francis Baring, 1st Baronet (1740–1810), banker
Sabine Baring-Gould (1834–1924), scholar, clergyman, novelist and antiquary
Sue Barker (born 1956), tennis player and television presenter
Kenneth Barnes (1878–1957), director of RADA
Cliff Bastin (1912–1991), Arsenal and England footballer
Phil Beer (born 1953), musician and composer (born at Exminster)
Matthew Bellamy (born 1978), guitarist, pianist, and vocalist of rock band Muse
John Bidlake (1755–1814), clergyman, author, artist
John Carne Bidwill (1815–1853), botanist, first Director, Royal Botanic Gardens, Sydney
Margaret Bingham (1740–1814), countess, painter and writer
Sir Thomas Bodley (1545–1613), diplomat and founder of the Bodleian Library at Oxford
Zachary Bogan (1625–1659), English scholar
Saint Boniface ( 675–754), patron saint of the Netherlands and Germany
Sir John Bowring (1792–1872), political economist and Governor of Hong Kong
Henry de Bracton (d. 1268), jurist
Eustace Budgell (1686–1737), writer
Tony Burrows (born 1942), pop singer
Richard Burton (1821–1890), explorer and linguist

C

Michael Caines (b. 1969), chef and restaurateur
Edward Capern (1819–1894), poet
Mary Carpenter (1807–1877), educational and social reformer
William Benjamin Carpenter (1813–1885), physiologist and naturalist
Raymond Cattell (1905–1998), psychology pioneer
Jim Causley (b. 1980, Heavitree), folk singer and radio presenter
Jimmy Cauty (b. 1956), pop musician
Henry Chadwick (1824–1908), journalist, "the father of baseball"
Sir Francis Chichester (1901–1972), aviator and sailor
Agatha Christie (1890–1976), novelist
Lady Mary Chudleigh (1656–1710), early feminist and poet
William Kingdon Clifford (1845–1879), mathematician
Eleanor Coade (1733–1821), inventor of Coade stone
Lily Cole (b. 1988), supermodel and actress
Samuel Taylor Coleridge (1772–1834), poet
David Collins (1756–1810), first Governor of Van Diemens Land (Tasmania)
Peter Cook (1937–1995), comedian, born in Torquay
William Cookworthy (1705–1780), pharmacist and industrialist
Tommy Cooper (1921–1984), comedian, was born in Caerphilly but lived in Exeter from the age of 3
Samuel Cousins (1801–1887), engraver
Edmund Crispin (1921–1978), novelist and composer
Lisa Cross (b. 1978), IFBB professional bodybuilder
William Crossing (1847–1928), author
Richard Cosway (1742-1821), miniature painter
Thomas Cameron (born 1998), classical singer/radio host

D
Thomas Daley (born 1994), diver
Sharron Davies (born 1962), Olympic swimmer and television presenter
David Rodgers (born 1952), Former TSW Presenter and Radio Station owner
Roger Deakins (born 1949), cinematographer
Kristian Digby (b. 1977 Torquay. d. 2010 London), television presenter
Francis Drake (–1596), sailor
Thomas d'Urfey (1653–1723), dramatist

E
Charles Lock Eastlake (1793–1865), artist
Marc Edworthy (born 1972), footballer
Samuel Eyles Pierce (1746–1829), preacher, theologian, and Calvinist divine
Henry Every (c. 1653/59–?), pirate
Sir Richard Eyre (born 1943), theatre, television, and film director

F
Percy Fawcett (1867–1925), archaeologist and explorer
Michael Foot (1913–2010), Labour politician
Trevor Francis (born 1954), professional footballer
Dawn French (born 1957), comedian
George Friend (born 1987), professional footballer for Middlesbrough F.C.
Luke Friend (born 1996), X Factor finalist

G
John Gay (1685–1732), poet and dramatist
Geraint (died 710), King of Dumnonia
Beth Gibbons (b. 1965), singer with Portishead
Humphrey Gilbert (–1583), sailor and explorer
John Glanville (1542–1600), MP and High Court Judge
Matthew Goode (b. 1978), actor in such movies as Brideshead Revisited and Watchmen
Dan Gosling (born 1990), English footballer
Francis Carruthers Gould (1844–1925), caricaturist and politician
William Greening, politician
Richard Grenville (1542–1591), sailor and explorer

H
George Hakewill (1578–1649), clergyman and author
William Hakewill (1574–1655), legal antiquarian
Carl Harbord (1908–1958), film actor
Theodore Bayley Hardy (1863–1918), Army chaplain and VC
Hannah Harper (b. 1982), erotic actress
Miranda Hart (b. 1972), actress and comedian
Henry Haversham Godwin-Austen (1834-1923), English topographer, geologist, naturalist and surveyor
Harriet Hawkins (b. 1980), professor of cultural geography
Matt Harvey, poet
Benjamin Haydon (1786–1846), painter and writer
Francis Hayman (1708–1776), Rococo artist
Oliver Heaviside (1850–1925), mathematician
Nicholas Hilliard, portraitist
Christopher Hitchens (1949–2011), writer, journalist, and literary critic
James Holman (1786–1857), noted blind traveller
John Hooker, constitutionalist
Richard Hooker (1554–1600), Anglican theologian
W. G. Hoskins (1908–1992), historian of the English landscape
Ben Howard (b. 1987), folk musician
Dominic Howard (b. 1977), musician, drummer of rock band Muse
Thomas Hudson (1701–1779), portrait painter
Rosie Huntington-Whiteley (b. 1987), model

J
Bradley James (born 1983 or 1984), actor
Thomas B. Jeffery (1845–1910), automotive pioneer who emigrated to the United States
Richard Roach Jewell (1810–1891), architect
Joseph of Exeter (12th century), poet

K
Fred Karno (1866–1941), comedy pioneer and impresario
Benjamin Kennicott (1718–1783), Hebrew scholar
Peter King, 1st Baron King (1669–1734), Lord Chancellor
Charles Kingsley (1819–1875), novelist
Steve Knightley (born 1954), musician (born in Poole, Dorset)
George Knight-Bruce (1853–1896), clergyman becoming Bishop of Bloemfontein, then translated to be the first Bishop of Mashonaland

L
Seth Lakeman (b. 1977), folk musician (Born in Frome, Somerset to Cornish parents)
William Elford Leach (1791–1836), scientist
Jon Lee (b. 1982 Newton Abbot), singer with S Club 7
Zion Lights (b. 1984), writer
Chris Lintott (b. 1980), scientist and writer
Matthew Locke (ca. 1621–1677), baroque composer.

M
Chris Martin (b. 1977), singer with Coldplay
Jane McGrath (1966–2008), co-founder of the McGrath Foundation and late wife of fast bowler Glenn
Liam Mooney (b. 1972), entrepreneur
 Penny Mordaunt (b. 1973), politician
Clare Morrall (b. 1952), novelist
Ian Mortimer (b. 1967), historian
Dean Moxey (b. 1986), professional footballer for Crystal Palace
Jerri Mumford (1909–2002), British-born Canadian servicewoman during World War II
Dermot Murnaghan (b. 1957), TV journalist and news presenter

N
Ben Nealon (b. 1966), actor
Luke Newberry (b. 1990), actor

O
Simon Ockley (1678–1720), orientalist
Ponsonby Ogle (1855–1902), British writer and journalist

P
Richard Parker (1767–1797), sailor and mutineer
James Parsons (1705–1770), physician, antiquary and author
Jo Pavey (b. 1973), Olympic Runner
William Peryam (1534–after 1603), lawyer
St Petroc, saint
Sergio Pizzorno (b. 1980), guitarist from the band Kasabian
John Prince (1643–1723), clergyman and biographer
Poker Alice (1851–1930), American frontier gambler
John Skinner Prout (1805–1876), writer and artist in Tasmania
Samuel Prout (1783–1852), watercolour artist

R

John Rainolds (1549–1605), Puritan scholar
Sir Walter Raleigh (1552–1618), sailor and writer
Chris Read (b. 1978), English test cricket wicket-keeper
Joshua Reynolds (1723–1792), influential English painter
Peter Richardson (b. 1952), actor, comedian, director and writer
Philip Hutchins Rogers (1794–1853), artist
Sir Henry Rosewell (1590–1656), Puritan, of Forde Abbey, adventurer of the Dorchester Company
John Rowe (1715–1787), merchant and owner of ship involved in the Boston Tea Party
John "Jack" Russell (1795–1883), eponymous dog-breeder and a founder member of the Kennel Club
Lobsang Rampa (1910–1981), author and plumber

S
Robert Falcon Scott (1868–1912), RN officer and Antarctic explorer
Sir Nicholas Slanning (1606–1643), MP, Royalist soldier in the English Civil War
Wayne Sleep (b. 1948), dancer and choreographer
Lilly Martin Spencer (1822–1902), US painter
Samuel Stennett (1727–1795), Baptist minister and hymnwriter
John Stockham (1765–1814), naval officer
Robert Stone (1516–1613), composer and member of the Chapel Royal.
Henrietta Anne Stuart (1644–1670), daughter of King Charles I
Anthony Sullivan (b. 1969), TV commercial pitchman, and co-star of the show Pitchmen on Discovery Channel
Sam Simmonds (b. 1994), Exeter Chiefs and England rugby player

T
Liam Tancock (b. 1985), Olympic swimmer
William Temple (1881–1944), Archbishop of Canterbury
Clive Toye (b. 1932), first general manager of New York Cosmos

V
Irene Vanbrugh (1872–1949), actress
Phil Vickery (b. 1976), rugby player
David Vine (1935–2009), TV sports presenter

W
Snowy White (b. 1948), guitarist
William John Wills (1834–1861), explorer
Chris Wolstenholme (b. 1978), musician, bass player for the band Muse
Rebecca Worthley (b. 1981), singer-songwriter
Rosemary West (b. 1953), serial killer with Fred West
Josh Widdicombe (b. 1983), comedian

Y
Thomas Yalden (1670–1736), poet

See also
List of people from Exeter
List of people from Plymouth

References

Further reading
Burton, S. H. Great Men of Devon. (Men of the Counties Series; no. 8.) London: John Lane, 1956

Devon
People
Devon